The New York Cosmos were an American soccer club based in New York. The team was founded in 1970 by brothers Ahmet and Nesuhi Ertegun, with the support of Warner Brothers president Steve Ross. The Cosmos joined the North American Soccer League (NASL), which was in its fourth season. Backed by the financial resources of Warner Communications, the Cosmos became the league's "marquee club", winning five championships and drawing unprecedented crowds for American club soccer. The side's commercial and on-field success declined during the early 1980s, along with the NASL itself, and it ceased operations in 1985, a year after the league folded. A new Cosmos team, formed in 2010, is scheduled to begin play in the new second-tier North American Soccer League (contested since 2011) during the 2013 season.

The NASL all-star teams selected by the league at the end of each season included a total of 18 Cosmos players. These include numerous well-known players from outside the United States, signed from European or South American clubs. Examples of these are erstwhile West Germany captain Franz Beckenbauer and the former Brazil international players Pelé and Carlos Alberto; there were many others. Among the American players representing the Cosmos were two players born in Yugoslavia: U.S. international defender Werner Roth and Siegfried Stritzl, a midfielder. Canada international John Kerr, originally from Scotland, also turned out for New York during the early 1970s. Former Italy forward Giorgio Chinaglia holds many of the side's records pertaining to individual performance, appearing in the most matches, scoring the most goals and points, and sharing the record for most all-star appearances (six) with Vladislav Bogićević, a member of the Yugoslavia national team before his time with the Cosmos.

Each Cosmos player named to a NASL all-star team is named below, along with his regular season and play-off statistics. The nationality given for each player is based on the national team represented, or his birthplace if he is uncapped. No NASL all-star from the Cosmos was born in the United States or Canada. During the club's 14 NASL seasons, the league's Most Valuable Player (MVP) award was won by a Cosmos player on five occasions, which are also detailed below.

Key

Positions
GK = Goalkeeper
DF = Defender
MF = Midfielder
FW = Forward

Statistics
A = Appearances
G = Goals
P = Points
In the NASL, goals counted for two points; assists counted for one.

NASL all-stars

Footnotes

A.  Counting multiple all-star selections separately, these 18 players made 41 NASL all-star appearances.
B.  Yasin Özdenak played in the United States under the name Erol Yasin, and is generally referred to as such in NASL records.

References
Bibliography

General
Player statistics sourced to: Jose (2003).
Background sourced to: Jose (2003), Newsham (2006) and Toye (2006).
Notes

 
Association football player non-biographical articles
New York Cosmos
New York Cosmos